Coulton is a village and civil parish in the Ryedale district of North Yorkshire, England, it is about  south of Helmsley.

History
The village is mentioned in the Domesday Book as Coletun. The lands around the village are mentioned in four entries, in which landowners at the time of the Norman invasion include Orm, Son of Gamal, Othulf, Uthred and King Edward. After the invasion, the lands were granted to Count Robert of Mortain, Hugh, son of Baldric and King William.

Governance
The village lies within the Thirsk and Malton UK Parliament constituency. It also lies within the Hovingham & Sheriff Hutton electoral division of North Yorkshire County Council and the Ampleforth ward of Ryedale District Council.

Geography
The nearest settlements are Hovingham  to the north-east; Scackleton  to the south-east; Cawton  to the north and Brandsby  to the south-west.

The 1881 UK Census recorded the population as 131. This decreased to 69 in the 1961 UK Census.

References

External links

Villages in North Yorkshire
Civil parishes in North Yorkshire